BS1 or BS-1 may refer to :
 BS1 Records, a record label producing the artist TC
 BS-1 Tishina, a Russian silenced 30mm grenade launcher
 Glasflügel BS-1, a glider
 NHK BS1, a Japanese satellite television channel
 BS1, a center drill bit size
 BS1, a BS postcode area in Bristol, England
 BASIC Stamp 1, a microcontroller
 BS-I Bharat Stage emission standards in India

See also
 BSI (disambiguation)